Kirkness may refer to:

Kirkness, Edmonton, a neighbourhood in Edmonton, Canada
Geoffrey Kirkness, British actor
William Kirkness (1862-1944), Australian politician
Verna Kirkness (born 1935), Canadian academic

See also
Kirkenes, a town in Norway
William Douglas of Kirkness, British officer and politician